Bithyas may refer to:
Beithys, king of the Odrysian kingdom of Thrace
Bithyas River, a river of ancient Thrace